Operation Grapple was  the codeword used to cover UK defence operations in support of the UN peacekeeping missions in the former Yugoslavia (authorised by UNSCR 776 of September 1992); including the deployment of British forces in Bosnia and Croatia from October 1992 until December 1995 as part of  the United Nations Protection Force (UNPROFOR). UNPROFOR would eventually hand over the peacekeeping mission in Bosnia to NATO's Implementation Force (IFOR) in winter 1995. The British participation in the IFOR was called Operation Resolute; the whole NATO mission was called Operation Joint Endeavour. The IFOR mission would last approximately a year, before it transitioned to the follow-on Stabilisation Force in Bosnia and Herzegovina (SFOR).

The United Kingdom originally deployed a compact army headquarters staff (commanded by a brigadier) - based in a former JNA barracks at Divulje near Split. The main manoeuvre forces were an infantry battle group (based in Bosnia); supported by an armoured reconnaissance squadron, a combat engineer squadron and a logistics support unit. A detachment of Fleet Air Arm Sea King troop carrying helicopters was also based in Divulje barracks (found from 845 and 846 Naval Air Squadrons). Some of the British unit locations were very isolated with only small amounts of security 
such as the Royal Engineers base at Camp Redoubt on a particularly hilly part of the main supply route to Vitez. The British contribution to UNPROFOR also included the deployment of Royal Navy ships sailing in the Adriatic Sea and RAF aircraft supporting troop movements in Croatia. This force would be increased in size over the course of the UN peacekeeping mandate in the Former Yugoslavia up until August 1995 when the British force was steadily drawn down.

The UK agreed to join the UN force to protect humanitarian convoys in Bosnia, as part of UNPROFOR 2. The first British Battalion (BRITBAT) was the Cheshire Regiment which deployed with its armoured vehicles in October 1992 through the Croatian port of Split, eventually headquartering itself in a school on the outskirts of the town of Vitez in the Lašva Valley. The battalion would have operating bases in Gornji Vakuf and Tuzla; and there was also a British logistics base at Tomislavgrad. The British contingent was expanded with the addition of another battalion group in March 1994.

The first BRITBAT's time in Bosnia was not without controversy and its commanding officer Lieutenant Colonel Bob Stewart very publicly lost his composure and impartiality after his unit discovered the remains of Muslim civilians who had been massacred by Croats in the village of Ahmići in April 1993.

British units took casualties from the outset and Lance Corporal Wayne Edwards, a Warrior tracked armoured vehicle driver, was shot and killed by a sniper, whilst driving his vehicle in Gornji Vakuf on 13 January 1993. Others would also sadly lose their lives; such as Private Shaun Taylor mortally wounded on 26 June 1994 near Goražde. British armed forces would serve nearly 15 years in Bosnia and would see more than 50 comrades killed and many more wounded. Even more tragically it was Bosnia and Croatia's appalling road and weather conditions that caused many of the deaths and injuries.

BRITBAT and its supporting sub-units would win praise by becoming the guardians of the only functioning main supply route into the core of Bosnia and ultimately Sarajevo and Tuzla, the maintenance of Routes Triangle and Diamond would remain a critical combat engineering task.

Key British officers involved in Operation Grapple
The following officers filled key roles in the UK's UNPROFOR mission:

 Lieutenant General Sir Michael Rose Commander UN Forces in Bosnia Herzegovina
 Major General David Pennefather Commander UN Rapid Reaction Force
 Brigadier Andrew Cumming - COMBRITFOR Grapple 1
 Brigadier Robin Searby - COMBRITFOR Grapple 2
 Brigadier John Reith - COMBRITFOR Grapple 3
 Brigadier Andrew Pringle - COMBRITFOR Grapple 6
 Lieutenant Colonel Bob Stewart - CO of the Cheshire Regiment
 Lieutenant Colonel Alastair Duncan - CO of the Prince of Wales's Own Regiment of Yorkshire
 Lieutenant Colonel Peter Williams - CO of the Coldstream Guards
 Lieutenant Colonel David Santa-Olalla - CO of the Duke of Wellington's Regiment
 Lieutenant Colonel Jeff Cook - CO of the Devonshire and Dorset Regiment
 Lieutenant Colonel Jonathon Riley - CO of the Royal Welch Fusiliers.
 Lieutenant Colonel Dick Applegate - CO BRITARTYBAT 19th Regiment Royal Artillery and 1 NL Battery RNLMC

See also
 Yugoslav Wars
 Battle of the Barracks
 Bosnian War
 Lašva Valley ethnic cleansing
 Foreign fighters in the Bosnian War
 List of massacres in Bosnia and Herzegovina

References

 https://web.archive.org/web/20120811171610/http://www.britains-smallwars.com/Bosnia/bosnia-units.html
 http://www.army.mod.uk/royalengineers/org/35regt/37sqn/37_sqn__history.htm

British Army deployments
United Nations operations in the former Yugoslavia
Bosnia and Herzegovina–United Kingdom relations
Bosnian War
Croatian War of Independence